The Tenderfoot is an English indie rock band featuring members Darren Moon (also of the Modern Ovens), Gavin Moon, Russell Prior, Joel Gibson and Marc Beatty of Brakes.

The band has released two albums to date: Vale Industrial in 2004 and Save The Year in 2005 both on Sony BMG's 5:15 label.

The Tenderfoot’s debut was well received, with plays on BBC Radio 1, London's Xfm and 6Music

Members of the band are also associated with acts such as Brakes and The Modern Ovens.

The Tenderfoot also featured on a 2006 Qmagazine compilation Mellow Gold alongside Evan Dando, I Am Kloot and Elliott Smith and on a British Sea Power B-Side for the song "A Lovely Day Tomorrow".

In 2008, the song "People are the Problem" was featured on the Independents Day ID08 compilation album.

Discography

Studio albums
Vale Industrial (2004)
Save The Year (2005)

Singles
"Still Holding My Stomach In" (2004) 
"Waking Me Up Again" (2004)
"Cowbell Blues" (2005)

Compilation albums
Acoustic Chill Volume 2 
Mellow Gold

See also
Brakes

References

External links
  
   RFB
 British Sea Power's big hero
 The Tenderfoot on Myspace
 
   RFB

English indie rock groups
Musical groups from Brighton and Hove
Musical groups established in 2002
2002 establishments in England